Makah Bay is a bay in Clallam County, Washington, United States, located near the community of Neah Bay. Both the Waatch and Tsoo-Yess Rivers flow into this bay.

See also
Makah (disambiguation)
Makah Reservation  
Neah Bay 
Cape Flattery

References

Bays of Washington (state)
Bodies of water of Clallam County, Washington
Washington placenames of Native American origin